Peter Lawrence Buck (born December 6, 1956) is an American musician and songwriter. He was a co-founder and the lead guitarist of the alternative rock band R.E.M. He also plays the banjo and mandolin on several R.E.M. songs. Throughout his career with R.E.M. (1980–2011), as well as during his subsequent solo career, Buck has also been at various times an official member of numerous 'side project' groups. These groups included Arthur Buck (with Joseph Arthur), Hindu Love Gods, The Minus 5, Tuatara, The Baseball Project, Robyn Hitchcock and the Venus 3, Tired Pony, The No-Ones and Filthy Friends, each of which have released at least one full-length studio album. Additionally, the experimental combo Slow Music (which also features Fred Chalenor, Hector Zazou, Matt Chamberlain, Robert Fripp, and Bill Rieflin) have released an official live concert CD.  Another side project group called Full Time Men released an EP while Buck was a member.  As well, ad hoc "supergroups" Bingo Hand Job (Billy Bragg and R.E.M.), Musical Kings (Michelle Malone, Peter Buck, John Keane) and Nigel & The Crosses (Robyn Hitchcock, Peter Buck, Glenn Tilbrook and others) have each commercially released one track.

"Richard M. Nixon", a band Buck founded in 2012 to support the release of his solo album with live gigs, has never issued an official recording. Richard M. Nixon consists of Buck, Scott McCaughey and Bill Rieflin, the same three musicians who comprise The Venus 3.

Buck also has a career as a record producer including releases by Uncle Tupelo, Vigilantes of Love, Dreams So Real, The Fleshtones, The Feelies, and The Jayhawks, as well as a session musician (for the likes of The Replacements, Billy Bragg, Decemberists and Eels).

Early life
Peter Lawrence Buck was born on December 6, 1956, in Berkeley, California, to Peter and Violet Buck. After spending time in Los Angeles and San Francisco, the Buck family moved, via Roswell, Georgia, to Atlanta. After graduating with honors from Crestwood High School in 1975, Buck attended Emory University and joined Delta Tau Delta fraternity. He eventually dropped out of Emory. Buck moved to Athens, Georgia, and attended the University of Georgia as well. While in Athens, Buck worked at the Wuxtry Records store, where he met future bandmate Michael Stipe as well as R.E.M.'s future manager, Bertis Downs.

Music

Buck's style of guitar playing is simple and yet distinctive. He makes wide use of open strings while chording to create chiming and memorable pop melodies. His sound, especially on mid-period R.E.M. albums that saw the band break through to international popularity, has been associated with Rickenbacker guitars, particularly a Jetglo (black) model 360. He has also used a wide variety of other instruments as the group has continued to experiment and develop. On some more recent R.E.M. releases prior to Accelerate (2008), his guitar parts have been less prominent.

"When Peter plays guitar, there's a strong sense of fuck off that comes from his side of the stage. And you feel that he wants to be in a band because he likes what they do... but that's all," explained U2's lead singer Bono in 2003. "And it's almost like performing and having to deal with all of that is a bit of a compromise for him, so just fuck off. And I like that energy a little bit, and that gives them their aggression."

Buck has produced many bands, including Uncle Tupelo, Dreams So Real, Drivin N Cryin, The Fleshtones, Charlie Pickett, and The Feelies. Buck also has made contributions on many other musicians' albums, including The Replacements, Billy Bragg, The Decemberists, Robyn Hitchcock, and several Eels albums.

Peter, Mike Mills, Bill Berry and Warren Zevon recorded an album under the band name Hindu Love Gods, while the R.E.M. bandmates and Zevon were recording tracks for Zevon's 1987 album Sentimental Hygiene. Hindu Love Gods is one of many names the members of R.E.M. have used performing around the Athens area. Buck also continued to play live locally with the Normaltown Flyers, performing country and rock standards in local bars. 

The three instrumentalists from R.E.M. all performed on Nikki Sudden's 1991 album The Jewel Thief, including the single "I Belong to You".

Buck also coproduced the 1992 Vigilantes of Love album, Killing Floor, with songwriter Mark Heard. He co-wrote, produced, and performed on Mark Eitzel's 1997 album West. He recorded an EP with Keith Streng of The Fleshtones as Full Time Men in 1985, and along with R.E.M. sideman Scott McCaughey has been a partner in The Minus 5 and a member of the instrumental band Tuatara. Additionally, In October 2005, he joined R.E.M. studio drummer Bill Rieflin, King Crimson guitarist Robert Fripp and three others in forming an improvisational performance band called Slow Music. His voice can be heard on one R.E.M. song: "I Walked with a Zombie" from the Roky Erickson tribute album Where the Pyramid Meets the Eye. In 2006, Buck toured with Robyn Hitchcock, McCaughey, and Rieflin as lead guitarist for Robyn Hitchcock and the Venus 3 in the wake of the band's first release, Olé! Tarantula. In 2008, after McCaughey and Steve Wynn decided to work together, the duo asked Buck to be the bass player in their new band, The Baseball Project, along with drummer Linda Pitmon.

Buck has contributed liner notes to compilations, reissues, and special editions, both of R.E.M.'s own material (the best-of compilations Eponymous and In Time, the rarities, B-sides and out-takes collection Dead Letter Office, and the special edition of New Adventures in Hi-Fi) and of other artists' work (such as The Beach Boys' Love You).
On September 9, 2008, immediately following the band's concert in Helsinki, Buck's signature Rickenbacker guitar, used live and in the studio since Chronic Town in 1982, was stolen from the stage. It was returned on September 18, 2008, by an anonymous source.

In March 2012, six months after R.E.M.'s September 2011 dissolution, Buck, now signed to Mississippi Records, announced intentions of working on a solo album, backed by singer-songwriter Joseph Arthur. The first track from the self-titled solo album, "10 Million BC," was released via SoundCloud on June 21, 2012. His eponymous first album was released later that same year.

In the final days of 2013, Buck announced he would be releasing his second solo album soon. The new project, titled I Am Back to Blow Your Mind Once Again, was released on February 18, 2014, again on vinyl only.

In 2015, Buck released his third solo album, Warzone Earth, under Little Axe Records.

In April 2017, Buck released the first single "Any Kind of Crowd" from his latest collaborative project with Filthy Friends, a super group with long time associates Scott McCaughey, Bill Rieflin, Kurt Bloch and Corin Tucker of Sleater-Kinney. The same month also saw another new release with Buck and McCaughey teaming up with Frode Strømstad and Arne Kjelsrud Mathisen of Norwegian band I Was A King to form the group The No Ones. The first song from their Sun Station EP was released, with the EP set to follow later in the year.

Arthur Buck, a side project with singer-songwriter Joseph Arthur in which Buck and Arthur share songwriting duties, released their eponymous debut album in June 2018. The following year, the Luke Haines collaboration Beat Poetry for Survivalists was released.

Personal life
Starting in the 1990s, Buck relocated to the Pacific Northwest and divided time between Portland, Oregon, and Seattle, Washington. Buck currently lives in Todos Santos, Baja California Sur, Mexico.

The guitarist is twice divorced. He was once married to Barrie Buck, the owner of Athens' 40 Watt Club. He has twin daughters with his ex-wife Stephanie Dorgan, Zelda and Zoe, born in June 1994. During his marriage to Dorgan, Buck became a partner in the music venue that she owned in Seattle, Crocodile Café, and often played there with his other band, The Minus 5. Buck married his third wife, Chloe Johnson, on June 1, 2013, in Portland, Oregon.

Buck is known for his encyclopedic knowledge of music, as well as his extensive personal record collection. Buck estimated his record collection to be around 25,000 in the late 1990s (he estimated he had 10,000 vinyl singles, 6,000 LPs and 4,000 CDs).

Buck is an atheist.

Airline incident
On April 21, 2001, Buck was aboard a transatlantic flight (British Airways #48) from Seattle to London to play a concert at Trafalgar Square. Witnesses alleged that Buck exhibited various bizarre behaviors on the flight, including shoving a CD into a drinks trolley thinking it was a CD player, tearing up the "yellow card" warning notice handed to him by the flight crew, claiming "I am R.E.M." and being involved in a struggle over a yogurt cup with two flight attendants, which resulted in the cup exploding. Buck's actions led to two charges of common assault on the flight attendants, one charge of being drunk on a plane and one charge of damaging British Airways cutlery and crockery.

At the ensuing trial in London, Buck's defense claimed that the moderate amount of wine he had drunk had reacted adversely with the brand of sleeping pill he was taking and rendered him unable to control his actions. The prosecution argued that he was simply intoxicated from supposedly consuming 15 glasses of wine. After the trial, which included testimony from Bono, the lead singer of the Irish rock band U2, Buck was cleared on the grounds of non-insane automatism.

Discography

With R.E.M.
Chronic Town EP (I.R.S.) 1982
Murmur (I.R.S.) 1983
Reckoning (I.R.S.) 1984
Fables of the Reconstruction (I.R.S.) 1984
Lifes Rich Pageant (I.R.S.) 1986
Document (I.R.S.) 1987
Green (Warner Bros.) 1988
Out of Time (Warner Bros.) 1991
Automatic for the People (Warner Bros.) 1992
Monster (Warner Bros.) 1994
New Adventures in Hi-Fi (Warner Bros.) 1996
Up (Warner Bros.) 1998
Reveal (Warner Bros.) 2001
Around the Sun (Warner Bros.) 2004
Accelerate (Warner Bros.) 2008
Collapse into Now (Warner Bros.) 2011

Solo
Peter Buck (Mississippi) 2012
I Am Back to Blow Your Mind Once Again (Mississippi) 2014
Warzone Earth (Mississippi) 2015
Dear December (Yep Rock) 2017
Beat Poetry for Survivalists (Omnivore) 2020
All the Kids are Super Bummed Out (Cherry Red) 2022

Produced
Alejandro Escovedo: Burn Something Beautiful (Fantasy) 2016
Dreams So Real: Father's House (Coyote) 1986
The Feelies: The Good Earth (Twin/Tone) 1986
The Fleshtones: Beautiful Light (Naked Language) 1993
The Jayhawks: Paging Mr. Proust (Thirty Tigers/Sham) 2016
John Wesly Harding: Greatest Other People's Hits (Omnivore) 2018
Uncle Tupelo: March 6-20, 1992 (Rockville) 1992
Vigilantes of Love: Killing Floor (Fingerprint/Sky) 1992

Recorded with

Arthur Buck
Arthur Buck (New West) 2018
The Baseball Project
Baseball Project, Vol. 2: High Inside (Yep Rock) 2011
3rd (Yep Rock) 2014
Mark Eitzel & Peter Buck
Words + Music (Warner Bros.) 1997
Filthy Friends 
Invitation (Kill Rock Stars) 2017
Emerald Valley (Kill Rock Stars) 2019
Hindu Love Gods
Hindu Love Gods (Reprise) 1990
The Minus 5 
Old Liquidator (Glitterhouse Records) 1995
The Lonesome Death of Buck McCoy (Hollywood/Malt) 1997
Let the War Against Music Begin (Mammoth/Malt) 2001
I Don't Know Who I Am (Let the War Against Music Begin, Vol. 2) (Return to Sender) 2003
Down with Wilco (Yep Rock) 2003
In Rock (The Minus 5 album) (Yep Rock) 2004
Gun Album (Yep Rock) 2006
The Minus 5 (Yep Rock) 2006
Killingsworth (Yep Rock) 2009
Of Monkees and Men (Yep Rock) 2010
Dear December (Yep Rock) 2017
Stroke Manor (Yep Rock) 2016
Tuatara
Breaking the Ethers (Epic) 1997
Trading with the Enemy (Fast Horse) 2001
Cinemathique (Fast Horse) 2002
The Loading Program (Fast Horse) 2003
East of the Sun (Fast Horse) 2007
West of the Moon (Fast Horse) 2007
The Here and the Gone (Fast Horse) 2008
Underworld (Sunyata) 2014
Shamanic Nights (Sunyata) 2016
Robyn Hitchcock and the Venus Three
Olé! Tarantula (Yep Rock) 2006
Goodnight Oslo (Yep Rock) 2009
Propellor Time (Yep Rock) 2010
Tired Pony
The Place We Ran From (Fiction/Polydor) 2010
The Ghost of the Mountain (Fiction Records|Fiction/Polydor) 2013
The No Ones
The Great Lost No Ones Album (Yep Rock) 2020
Slow Music Project
Live at the Croc 19 Oct 2005 (Slow Music) 2005
Full Time Men
Full Time Men EP (Coyote) 1985

References

Further reading

External links

 
1956 births
Living people
American atheists
American mandolinists
American rock bass guitarists
American male bass guitarists
American rock guitarists
American male guitarists
American rock songwriters
American male songwriters
Appalachian dulcimer players
Eels (band) members
Lead guitarists
Musicians from Athens, Georgia
Musicians from Portland, Oregon
R.E.M. members
The Baseball Project members
The Minus 5 members
Tired Pony members
Tuatara (band) members
University of Georgia people
Musicians from Seattle
American alternative rock musicians
Alternative rock guitarists
Hindu Love Gods (band) members
American expatriate musicians
American expatriates in Mexico
People from Baja California Sur
Grammy Award winners
Guitarists from Georgia (U.S. state)
Guitarists from Oregon
Guitarists from California
Guitarists from Washington (state)
Record producers from Georgia (U.S. state)
Record producers from California
Record producers from Washington (state)
Record producers from Oregon
20th-century American guitarists
21st-century American guitarists
Filthy Friends members